Bart Dodson is an American paralympic athlete. He is from the United States competing mainly in category T51 wheelchair racing events.

Biography
Dodson has been part of five summer paralympics, winning twenty medals thirteen of them gold.  His first games were in 1984 where despite competing in the 100m, 200m, 400m and 800m, winning a silver in the 200m it was unusually in the field events where he won gold medals in the club throw and pentathlon in what would prove the only time he competed in the field at the paralympics.  By the 1988 Summer Paralympics Dodson was competing exclusively on the track competing  in every distance from 200m to marathon winning bronze in the 1500m and marathon he was also part of the American gold medal winning relay teams in the 4 × 100 m and 4 × 200 m.  1992 Summer Paralympics would prove to be the apex of Dodson's career as he dominated on the track winning every distance from 100m to 5000m as well as winning two relay golds with the American 4 × 100 m and 4 × 400 m teams. His fourth games in 1996 were not as successful as he only picked up a bronze in 800m and silver in the marathon and missed out on medals entirely in the 1500m and 400m.  His last games in 2000 yielded yet another gold medal in the 200m as well as a further bronze in the 400m this time missing out in the 800m and 1500m.

References

External links 
 

Paralympic track and field athletes of the United States
Athletes (track and field) at the 1984 Summer Paralympics
Athletes (track and field) at the 1988 Summer Paralympics
Athletes (track and field) at the 1992 Summer Paralympics
Athletes (track and field) at the 1996 Summer Paralympics
Athletes (track and field) at the 2000 Summer Paralympics
Paralympic gold medalists for the United States
Paralympic silver medalists for the United States
Paralympic bronze medalists for the United States
Club throwers
Living people
Medalists at the 1984 Summer Paralympics
Medalists at the 1988 Summer Paralympics
Medalists at the 1992 Summer Paralympics
Medalists at the 1996 Summer Paralympics
Medalists at the 2000 Summer Paralympics
Year of birth missing (living people)
Paralympic medalists in athletics (track and field)
American male wheelchair racers